Vincenzo Napoli (born 30 July 1950 in Salerno) is an Italian politician.

He is a member of the Democratic Party and he was elected Mayor of Salerno on 5 June 2016 and took office on 14 June.

See also
2016 Italian local elections
List of mayors of Salerno

References

External links
 
 

1950 births
Living people
Mayors of Salerno
People from Salerno
Democratic Party (Italy) politicians